Norburn Terrace is a historic home located at Raleigh, Wake County, North Carolina.  It was built about 1898, and is a two-story, three bay, "T"-shaped, Late Victorian style brick dwelling.  It features an octagonal tower with a spire roof and decorative porch with a spindle frieze and turned balusters.  It was the home of Herbert E. Norris, a prominent Wake County attorney and politician.

It was listed on the National Register of Historic Places in 1980.

References

Houses on the National Register of Historic Places in North Carolina
Victorian architecture in North Carolina
Houses completed in 1898
Houses in Raleigh, North Carolina
National Register of Historic Places in Raleigh, North Carolina